Macadam Bumper (also released as Pinball Wizard) is a video pinball simulation construction set developed by ERE Informatique in France. It was first released for 8-bit computers in 1985, the Atari ST in 1986 and MS-DOS in 1987. The Atari ST and MS-DOS versions were released in the US as Pinball Wizard in 1988 by Accolade.

Gameplay
The game includes full-featured graphics, sound and lights, and tilt capability. The game features four simulations with varying obstacles. On the Atari ST, the flipper and back-board controls are manipulated by the mouse, but moving the mouse too much will activate the tilt sensors. Players can customize the game by changing parameters such as point scores, table slope, bumper elasticity, and the number of game balls. With the parts menu, a player can assemble a pinball machine, and can paint or decorate it with the game's paint menu.

Reception
In 1988, Dragon gave the game 4½ out of 5 stars.

Reviews
Tilt - Jul, 1985
Sinclair User - Nov, 1985
Computer Gamer - Aug, 1986
ASM (Aktueller Software Markt) - Feb, 1990
Zzap! - Dec, 1990
ASM (Aktueller Software Markt) - Oct, 1987

See also
 Pinball Construction Set

References

External links
Macadam Bumper at MobyGames
Macadam Bumper at Centre for Computing History
Review in Antic

1985 video games
Accolade (company) games
Amstrad CPC games
Atari ST games
Commodore 64 games
DOS games
MSX games
Oric games
Personal Software Services games
Pinball video games
Video games developed in France
ZX Spectrum games